The Hundred of Carina is a cadastral hundred of County of Robinson in South Australia.
The postcode is 5654

References

Carina